Eburodacrys nemorivaga is a species of beetle in the family Cerambycidae. It was described by Gounelle in 1909.

References

Eburodacrys
Beetles described in 1909